Tipton Sports Academy is a multi-purpose sports stadium located on Wednesbury Oak Road in Tipton, West Midlands, England.

It includes a running track, a football pitch and indoor tennis courts. The synthetic running track was laid out in 1998 to replace a cinder track. This work was completed at the same time as the indoor tennis courts, and the full cost of upgrading the complex (more than £3million) was paid by the National Lottery. It was opened by the then Deputy Prime Minister John Prescott at an official ceremony on 12 June 1998.

Prince Philip, Duke of Edinburgh, had opened the headquarters of Tipton Sports Union Trust at the site on 4 June 1971. These facilities were replaced by those opened by John Prescott 27 years later.

The complex is home to Tipton Town Football Club and the Sandwell Steelers American Football team, and its facilities are used by various professional and amateur teams as well as members of the public.

External links
 Activities available at Tipton Sports Academy
 runtrackdir.com

Sports venues in Sandwell
Football venues in England
Sports academies
American football venues in the United Kingdom
Tipton
Tipton Town F.C.